The 2019-20 Bowling Green Falcons men's ice hockey season was the 51st season of play for the program and the 7th in the WCHA conference. The Falcons represented Bowling Green State University and were coached by Ty Eigner, in his 1st season.

The team's season ended abruptly when the WCHA announced that the remainder of the tournament was cancelled due to the COVID-19 pandemic in the United States on March 12, 2020.

Roster

As of September 9, 2019.

Standings

Schedule and Results

|-
!colspan=12 style=";" | Regular Season

|-
!colspan=12 style=";" | 

|-
!colspan=12 style=";" | 

|- align="center" bgcolor="#e0e0e0"
|colspan=12|Bowling Green Won Series 2–0
|- align="center" bgcolor="#e0e0e0"
|colspan=12|Remainder of Tournament Cancelled

Scoring Statistics

Goaltending statistics

Rankings

References

Bowling Green Falcons men's ice hockey seasons
Bowling Green Falcons
Bowling Green Falcons
Bowling Green Falcons
Bowling Green Falcons